Godar Pahn (also Romanized as Godār Pahn; also known as Gaudarpahn and Gudarpahn) is a village in Kolyai Rural District, in the Central District of Asadabad County, Hamadan Province, Iran. At the 2006 census, its population was 317, in 65 families.

References

See also 
Gudar people

Populated places in Asadabad County